= Van Hauen Pass =

Mountain pass in Nunavut, Canada

- Location within Nunavut

Third Approach
- Location: Nunavut, Canada
- Coordinates: 81°03′32″N 85°45′57″W
- Topo map: NTS 340C3 Van Hauen Pass

Van Hauen Pass is a mountain pass on northwestern Ellesmere Island, Nunavut, Canada.
